The University of Applied Sciences Ludwigshafen (German: Hochschule Ludwigshafen) is a public university located in Ludwigshafen, Germany. It was founded in 1965 as Higher School of Commerce Ludwigshafen. In 1971 it became part of the University of Applied Sciences Rhineland Palatinate, which split up into seven autonomous universities in 1991.

Studies and teaching

The university offers Bachelor's and Master's degrees in several areas of business administration and social affairs.

In addition to the classic full-time format, part-time and dual offers in the Bachelor and Master areas are currently playing a decisive role. There are the following selection of bachelor courses: 
 Business Taxation and Auditing
 Business Controlling
 Financial Services and Corporate Finance
 International Business Management (East Asia)
 International Management Eastern Europe
 International Personnel Management and Organization
 Midwifery (dual)
 Logistics
 Marketing
 Nursing (dual)
 Nursing Education
 Social Work 
 Business Informatics

Central facilities

The Ludwigshafen University Library is largely designed as an open-access library and is spread over three branches. It holds 122000 books, 49700 e-books, 270 journals, 41250 e-journals (2019).

The Competence and Support Center E-Learning supports learners and teachers in questions of e-learning.

The Office for Studies and Teaching is the contact facility for teachers, administration and students.

The Department of International Affairs is responsible for international cooperation and the central coordination of our university’s foreign contacts. It serves as the contact facility for prospective international students, enrolled international students and exchange students from partner universities.

Lecturers and alumni
Lecturers and former lecturers include the former German Minister for Economic Affairs and Energy Werner Müller.
 
Alumni of the university include the head of the SAP Global Labs Network Clas Neumann, the German politician Mario Brandenburg and the German high jumper Elena Herzenberg.

See also
 East Asia Institute Ludwigshafen
 Ludwigshafen
 Rhine Neckar Area
 Electoral Palatinate

References

External links
University of Applied Sciences Ludwigshafen

Universities and colleges in Rhineland-Palatinate
Universities of Applied Sciences in Germany
Ludwigshafen